Cassandra Michelle Rowe (born 6 September 1980) is an Australian politician. She has been a Labor member of the Western Australian Legislative Assembly since the 2017 state election, representing Belmont.

Rowe holds a Bachelor of Arts from the University of Melbourne, and has also studied finance and screenwriting. She worked as a financial planner and has been an active Labor Party member, serving as assistant state secretary and as director of the Labor Business Roundtable. She ran unsuccessfully for Belmont in 2013.

Her sister, Samantha Rowe, is a member of the Western Australian Legislative Council.

Rowe has been Government Whip from 17 March 2021 to present

References

1980 births
Living people
Australian Labor Party members of the Parliament of Western Australia
Members of the Western Australian Legislative Assembly
Women members of the Western Australian Legislative Assembly
21st-century Australian politicians
21st-century Australian women politicians